William C. "Bill" Kortz II is a Democratic member of the Pennsylvania House of Representatives for the 38th legislative district. He was elected in 2006.

Prior to elective office, Kortz served as an Operations Manager for the Irvin Plant of U.S. Steel. Kortz attended McKeesport Area High School and received a bachelor's degree in criminology from Indiana University of Pennsylvania. He also attended classes at the Duquesne University M.B.A. program.

Kortz, who was affiliated with anti-incumbent group PACleanSweep, defeated incumbent Representative Kenneth W. Ruffing in the 2006 Democratic party primary. Ruffing faced criticism stemming from his vote in favor of the controversial 2005 legislative pay raise.

References

External links
Pennsylvania House of Representatives - William C. Kortz  official PA House website
Pennsylvania House Democratic Caucus - William C. Kortz  official caucus website

Living people
Members of the Pennsylvania House of Representatives
21st-century American politicians
1954 births